The Andrew J. Warner House is a historic house in Ogden, Utah. It was built in 1890 for Andrew J. Warner, a realtor who later moved to Los Angeles, California before Utah became a state, and it was designed in the Queen Anne architectural style. It has been listed on the National Register of Historic Places since December 13, 1977.

References

		
National Register of Historic Places in Weber County, Utah
Queen Anne architecture in Utah
Houses completed in 1890
1890 establishments in Utah Territory